Andhra Pradesh Auto Rickshaw Drivers and Workers Federation or Andhra Pradesh Auto Drivers and Workers' Federation is a trade union of auto rickshaw drivers in Andhra Pradesh, India.

APARDWF is affiliated to the All India Trade Union Congress.

References

Trade unions in India
Transport trade unions in India
All India Trade Union Congress
Road transport trade unions
Trade unions in Andhra Pradesh
Rickshaws
Year of establishment missing